Michael Gregory Mizanin (born October 8, 1980) is an American professional wrestler, actor, and television personality. He is currently signed to WWE, where he performs on the Raw brand under the ring name The Miz.

Mizanin first gained fame as a reality television participant, appearing on The Real World: Back to New York in 2001 and its spin-off, Real World/Road Rules Challenge, from 2002 to 2005. He won Battle of the Seasons and The Inferno II. He reached the final of Battle of the Network Reality Stars, and won a Reality Stars-themed episode of Fear Factor in 2006. After finishing as runner-up in the fourth season of Tough Enough and subsequently launching his wrestling career, Mizanin appeared on Diva Search, Total Divas, Tough Enough, and hosted several seasons of The Challenge. He also stars in the reality television series Miz & Mrs. alongside his wife, Maryse Ouellet, and has starred in films produced by WWE Studios, namely The Marine franchise, Christmas Bounty (2013), and Santa's Little Helper (2015).

Mizanin signed with WWE in 2004, and debuted on the main roster in 2006. He has won the WWE Championship twice, the Intercontinental Championship eight times, the United States Championship twice, as well as a total of eight tag team championships, giving him 20 overall championships in WWE. As a result, he became WWE's 25th Triple Crown Champion and 14th Grand Slam Champion, as well as the first wrestler to accomplish the latter twice under the revised 2015 format. He also won the 2010 Money in the Bank ladder match. Mizanin is also the only WWE Triple Crown and Grand Slam champion to have won the Deep South Wrestling Heavyweight Championship, doing so while the promotion was WWE's developmental territory. Among WWE's most prolific pay-per-view event performers, Mizanin headlined WrestleMania XXVII in 2011, and was ranked No. 1 on Pro Wrestling Illustrateds annual PWI 500 list that same year.

Early life 
Michael Gregory Mizanin was born in Parma, Ohio, on October 8, 1980.  His parents are divorced; he has a step-father and two half-siblings. He attended Normandy High School, where he was the captain of the basketball and cross country teams, participated in swimming, was a member of the student government, and edited the yearbook. He then attended Miami University, where he was a member of the Theta Chi fraternity and studied business at the Richard T. Farmer School of Business before being chosen as a cast member on The Real World (2001).

Television career

Reality television

Rise to fame 
Mizanin dropped out of college, where he was pursuing a degree in business, in order to appear on the 10th season of MTV's reality television program The Real World in 2001. He went on to appear in multiple seasons of its spin-off series, Real World/Road Rules Challenge, along with contestants from both Road Rules and The Real World, including Battle of the Seasons, The Gauntlet, The Inferno, Battle of the Sexes 2 and The Inferno 2. Except for Battle of the Sexes 2, Mizanin made it to the end of all the Challenges on which he competed and won both Battle of the Seasons and The Inferno 2.

It was during an episode of The Real World that Mizanin first displayed an alter ego known as The Miz. In contrast to Mizanin's usually placid demeanor, The Miz was angry, combative and headstrong. Mizanin later realized that The Miz would make an excellent professional wrestling gimmick.

In 2004, he appeared on the Bravo reality show Battle of the Network Reality Stars, in which his team finished second. Mizanin was also a contestant in the "Reality Stars" episode of Fear Factor. His partner was his former girlfriend and castmate, Trishelle Cannatella, and the two won the competition. In April 2007, he appeared on the game show Identity, where he appeared as a stranger, and contestant John Kim correctly identified his identity as a professional wrestler by the odd way he added "Miz-" before most words. On October 5, 2011, Miz starred in an episode of H8R.

Return to MTV 
After a seven-year-long absence from The Challenge, Mizanin returned to the reality show on April 4, 2012 as the host of The Battle of the Exes season finale event and reunion special. It marked the first time The Miz appeared on the series since becoming a main-event WWE Superstar. Since then, he had become a mainstay reunion host as well as the host of The Challenge: Champs vs. Stars mini-series.

USA Network
In 2018, Mizanin and his wife Maryse began starring in a USA Network reality television series titled Miz & Mrs.. In 2020, he starred on a second show on USA, serving as host of the reality game show Cannonball.

Other television appearances
In 2008, Mizanin appeared on the Sci Fi reality series Ghost Hunters Live as a guest investigator. In 2009, Mizanin appeared on two episodes of Are You Smarter than a 5th Grader?, which were both aired on September 29. He appeared on an episode of Destroy Build Destroy on March 3, 2010. He also appeared as a guest star in a March 2012 episode of Psych. On March 31, Mizanin appeared in the first ever Slime Wrestling World Championship at the Nickelodeon Kids' Choice Awards, losing to Big Show and therefore being thrown into a tub of slime. In 2012, Mizanin appeared on the Disney XD show Pair of Kings as a guest star. In 2013, Miz along with Francia Raisa, were in a movie together called Christmas Bounty.

In September 2021, Mizanin was announced as one of the celebrities competing on the thirtieth season of Dancing with the Stars. He and his partner Witney Carson were the seventh couple to be eliminated, ultimately placing 9th. In 2022, Mizanin was briefly featured in archival footage in the Netflix docuseries Trainwreck: Woodstock '99.

Professional wrestling career

Ultimate Pro Wrestling (2003–2004) 
Pursuing the goal of becoming a professional wrestler, Mizanin joined Ultimate Pro Wrestling (UPW), where he trained in the Ultimate University. He made his in-ring debut in 2003 as The Miz. During his time with UPW, The Miz competed in UPW's Mat War's tournament, making it to the finals before losing to Tony Stradlin.

World Wrestling Entertainment/WWE

Tough Enough and developmental territories (2004–2006) 

In October 2004, Mike Mizanin entered the fourth season of Tough Enough, a televised competition which awarded the winner a World Wrestling Entertainment (WWE) contract and US$1,000,000. Despite coming last in an arm wrestling tournament on November 25, Mizanin outlasted six other wrestlers and reached the final round. At Armageddon on December 12, Mizanin faced the other remaining entrant, Daniel Puder, in a three-round "Dixie Dogfight" (boxing match). Neither man achieved a knockout, and the contest was awarded to Puder on the basis of crowd reaction. On the December 16 episode of SmackDown!, Puder was declared as the winner of Tough Enough by head trainer Al Snow. Despite coming up short on Tough Enough, Mizanin had piqued the interest of WWE and he was eventually offered a developmental contract.

Mizanin was sent to Deep South Wrestling (DSW) to train under Bill DeMott, relocating to McDonough, Georgia in the process. In July 2005, he wrestled two dark matches for WWE, teaming with former Tough Enough champion Matt Cappotelli to face The Highlanders (Robbie and Rory McAllister). On December 1, Mizanin defeated Mike Knox in the finals of a tournament to determine the inaugural Deep South Heavyweight Champion. He continued his partnership with Matt Cappotelli throughout the second half of 2005 in WWE dark matches and house shows until Cappotelli, nominally of Ohio Valley Wrestling (OVW), was diagnosed with a brain tumor after an injury at a taping in December 2005. After Cappotelli's death from brain cancer in June 2018, Miz revealed they were to be called up to the SmackDown roster as a tag team known as Reality Check in 2005, but these plans were halted due to Cappotelli's cancer diagnosis.

On January 3, 2006, it was reported that Mizanin had been transferred to OVW. On the January 18, 2006 OVW TV show, Mizanin made his debut as Miz with a Miz TV segment, where he was shown talking backstage. On the January 28 episode of the OVW television show, The Miz wrestled his first singles match against René Duprée, but lost by countout.

At the February 8 OVW TV taping, Miz and Chris Cage captured the OVW Southern Tag Team Championship, defeating Chet the Jett and Seth Skyfire. On March 19, Deuce Shade defeated Miz in a singles contest to win the championship for his team The Untouchables (Deuce Shade and Domino).

Main roster beginnings (2006–2007) 
From March 7 onwards, a video on WWE's website and vignettes on SmackDown! heralded The Miz debuting on the SmackDown! brand. When Mizanin actually attempted to make his debut on the April 21 episode of SmackDown!, he was in storyline banned from entering the arena by network executive Palmer Canon who told him that he had been "cancelled" before having security escort him from the premises.

The Miz debuted as the host of SmackDown! on June 2, hyping up the crowd at the top of the show. Other duties included backstage interviews and hosting a bikini contest. Starting in July, Miz, along with Ashley Massaro, hosted the annual Diva Search competition.

After the end of the Diva Search competition, The Miz began wrestling as a villain, making his in-ring debut with a win over Tatanka on the September 1 episode of SmackDown!. Over the next three months, The Miz remained undefeated, defeating such wrestlers as Matt Hardy, Funaki and Scotty 2 Hotty. At the same time he began a feud with Diva Search winner Layla El, who spurned his advances on more than one occasion, leading to Miz helping Kristal defeat her in various competitions. However, Miz and Kristal soon found themselves being stalked by The Boogeyman. This began a feud in which the Boogeyman ended The Miz's winning streak on December 17 at Armageddon.

At Royal Rumble on January 28, 2007, The Miz entered in the Royal Rumble match as the 29th entrant, but only lasted seven seconds before being eliminated by The Great Khali. On the February 2 episode of SmackDown, Miz defeated Matt Hardy once again with assistance from Joey Mercury. Following a brief absence from television, The Miz returned on the March 9 episode of SmackDown! to host an interview segment named Miz TV. After the unsuccessful segment, The Miz returned to in-ring competition with a more intense style and began to pick up wins once again.

Miz was drafted to the ECW brand on June 17 as part of the 2007 supplemental draft. He was absent from the first few weeks of ECW, though he was the subject of backstage mentions between matches and had several short Miz TV Crashes ECW video segments. He made his debut on the July 10 episode of ECW in a match against Nunzio, which he won.

Soon after, The Miz found new managers in Kelly Kelly, Layla El and Brooke Adams. He then began a feud with Balls Mahoney after Kelly Kelly began to fall in love with Mahoney on screen. On the October 2 episode of ECW, it was revealed that Miz owned the contracts of Kelly Kelly, Layla and Brooke Adams; and he used this excuse to stop Kelly from going out with Mahoney. He was nominated at Cyber Sunday on October 28 to face CM Punk for the ECW Championship. He won the vote, but lost the match. Later that month, he formed a tag team with Johnny Nitro.

Teaming with John Morrison (2007–2009) 

On the November 16 episode of SmackDown!, The Miz became one half of the WWE Tag Team Champions with John Morrison (the former Johnny Nitro) when they defeated Matt Hardy and Montel Vontavious Porter, giving Miz his first championship within the company. At Survivor Series two days later, Miz and Morrison competed in a triple threat match for the ECW Championship, with the champion CM Punk retaining.

In February 2008, Miz and Morrison were given a streaming segment on the WWE website named The Dirt Sheet in which they mocked other wrestlers and facets of pop culture, showing off their promo skills. Morrison and The Miz co-wrote each episode of The Dirt Sheet each week. Miz competed in a battle royal on the pre-show of WrestleMania XXIV on March 30 but was unsuccessful in winning after being eliminated by Jamie Noble. Miz and Morrison retained the titles against Kane and CM Punk at Judgment Day on May 18 and Finlay and Hornswoggle at Night of Champions on June 29, before dropping the championship to Curt Hawkins and Zack Ryder at the Great American Bash on July 20 in a fatal four-way match which also involved Jesse and Festus, ending their reign at 250 days. Neither Miz nor Morrison were pinned as Hawkins pinned Jesse to win the titles. Miz and Morrison soon followed a feud with Cryme Tyme (Shad Gaspard and JTG) as a battle of their webshows, Word Up and The Dirt Sheet. They were voted into a match with, and defeated Cryme Tyme on October 26 at Cyber Sunday. The team also feuded with D-Generation X (Triple H and Shawn Michaels). On the 800th episode of Raw, Miz and Morrison competed in a match against DX, and were defeated. On December 13, Miz and Morrison defeated Kofi Kingston and CM Punk to win the World Tag Team Championship during a WWE house show in Hamilton, Ontario, Canada.

In February 2009, the team engaged themselves in a feud with The Colóns (Carlito and Primo). In a dark match at WrestleMania 25 on April 5, they lost the World Tag Team Championship to The Colóns in a lumberjack match to unify the World Tag Team and the WWE Tag Team titles. On the April 13 episode of Raw, The Miz lost a match to Kofi Kingston due to Morrison accidentally getting Miz disqualified, which gave the Raw brand a draft pick in the 2009 WWE draft. The pick was then revealed to be The Miz and retaliated by subsequently attacking Morrison, ending their partnership and thus turning John Morrison into a fan favorite.

United States Champion (2009–2010) 

Miz challenged John Cena to a match on the April 27 episode of Raw, but as Cena was out due to injury, Miz claimed an unofficial win via forfeit and continued to do this over the following weeks, until Cena returned and defeated him in a singles match at The Bash in June. On the August 3 episode of Raw, The Miz lost to Cena in a lumberjack match, which meant that, in storyline, he was banned from the Staples Center, the Raw brand and SummerSlam. The following week on August 10, Miz competed under a mask as The Calgary Kid and won a Contract on Pole match against Eugene, earning a contract in storyline, and revealing himself by removing his mask afterwards. He then debuted his new finisher, the Skull-Crushing Finale, and used it on Eugene. After removing the mask to reveal himself, he cut a promo and debuted his catchphrase: "Because I'm The Miz... and I'm awesome".

After changing his in-ring attire from shorts to trunks, Miz would then set his sights on the United States Championship, held by Kofi Kingston. He unsuccessfully challenged for the championship at the Night of Champions on July 26, Breaking Point on September 13 and Hell in a Cell on October 4, before he won the championship on the October 5 episode of Raw his first singles championship in WWE. At Bragging Rights on October 25, Miz was inserted into an interpromotional match against SmackDown's Intercontinental Champion, Miz's erstwhile tag team partner John Morrison, whom he defeated. On November 22 at Survivor Series, Miz captained a team of five wrestlers against Team Morrison in a five-on-five Survivor Series elimination match and once again bested his former partner surviving with Sheamus and Drew McIntyre.

During this time, he gained a new entrance theme "I Came to Play", performed by the band Downstait. The Miz soon began a rivalry with MVP that began with a critically well-received verbal exchange between the two. The two met in an unadvertised match for the United States Championship at the Royal Rumble on January 31, 2010, with Miz retaining his title, but in the Royal Rumble match itself MVP eliminated both himself and The Miz. Also around this time, Miz formed a tag team with Big Show — later dubbed "ShoMiz" — and on the February 8 episode of Raw the two defeated D-Generation X (DX) and The Straight Edge Society to become the Unified WWE Tag Team Champions, making Miz the first wrestler in WWE history to hold three championships at the same time (United States, World Tag Team and WWE Tag Team Champion). At Elimination Chamber on February 21, Miz again successfully defended his United States Championship against MVP after interference from Big Show, ending their feud. At WrestleMania XXVI on March 28, ShoMiz defeated John Morrison and R-Truth to retain the title again. However, on the April 26 episode of Raw, ShoMiz lost the championship to The Hart Dynasty (David Hart Smith and Tyson Kidd), and Big Show would attack Miz after the match, bringing an end to the team.

On the May 17 episode of Raw, Miz lost the United States Championship to Bret Hart, despite Chris Jericho, William Regal and Vladimir Kozlov attempting to interfere on The Miz's behalf, ending his reign at 224 days. At Over the Limit on May 23, Miz and Jericho challenged The Hart Dynasty for the tag team championship, but lost. On the June 14 episode of Raw, The Miz defeated R-Truth, John Morrison and Zack Ryder in a fatal four-way match to win back the United States Championship for the second time. He retained the championship against R-Truth on June 20 at the Fatal 4-Way pay-per-view.

WWE Champion (2010–2011) 

On July 18 at Money in the Bank, The Miz won Raw's Money in the Bank ladder match to win a contract for a WWE Championship match that he could utilize at any time. Over the next few weeks, The Miz made various, unsuccessful attempts at cashing in his Money in the Bank contract on the WWE Champion Sheamus. At SummerSlam on August 15, Miz began a rivalry with his NXT rookie Daniel Bryan, which resulted in a United States Championship match between the two at the Night of Champions event on September 19 which Miz lost. At Hell in a Cell on October 3, Miz failed to regain the championship in a triple threat match also including John Morrison. At Bragging Rights on October 24, Miz led Team Raw (which also included R-Truth, Morrison, Santino Marella, Sheamus, CM Punk and Ezekiel Jackson), but they were defeated by Team SmackDown.

On the November 22 episode of Raw, he cashed in his Money in the Bank contract following a successful WWE Championship defense by Randy Orton against Wade Barrett to become the new WWE Champion. The following week, Miz made his first successful title defense, defeating Jerry "The King" Lawler in a Tables, Ladders and Chairs match after interference from Michael Cole. He successfully defended the championship at the TLC: Tables, Ladders & Chairs pay-per-view on December 19 by defeating Orton in a tables match following interference from Alex Riley. Miz retained the championship against Orton again at Royal Rumble on January 30, 2011 (after interference from CM Punk) and Lawler on February 20 at Elimination Chamber. On the Raw after Elimination Chamber, The Miz and John Cena were paired together by the Anonymous Raw General Manager to challenge The Corre (Justin Gabriel and Heath Slater) for the WWE Tag Team Championship. The Miz and Cena were successful in winning the titles, but lost them back to Corre immediately afterward in a rematch after The Miz turned on Cena. This made their 9 minute reign the shortest in the championship's history. The following week, The Miz lost Riley as his apprentice after Cena defeated Riley in a steel cage match with the stipulation that if Cena won, Riley was fired from his job. However Riley would be re-hired in mid-March, this time as Miz's "Vice President of Corporate Communications". In the main event of WrestleMania XXVII on April 3, The Miz successfully defended the WWE Championship against Cena, following interference from The Rock, who then attacked Miz afterwards.

At Extreme Rules on May 1, The Miz lost the WWE Championship to Cena in a triple threat steel cage match, also involving John Morrison, ending his reign at 160 days. He then failed to regain the championship from Cena again in an "I Quit" match at Over the Limit on May 22, after failed interference from Riley. The following night on Raw, the Anonymous Raw General Manager denied The Miz's request for another WWE Championship match; Miz blamed Riley for being unable to regain the championship. Riley then attacked him, turning Riley into a fan favorite. At Capitol Punishment on June 19, Miz lost to Riley. The Miz also failed to win Raw's Money in the Bank ladder match at the titular event on July 17. After the WWE Championship was declared vacant by Vince McMahon, Miz would enter into a tournament to crown a new champion, defeating Riley and Kofi Kingston to advance to the finals, where he lost to Rey Mysterio. At SummerSlam on August 14, Miz, R-Truth, and Alberto Del Rio lost to Mysterio, Kingston and Morrison.

The Awesome Truth (2011–2012) 

On the August 22 episode of Raw, Miz and R-Truth attacked Santino Marella before his match. They then cut a promo agreeing there was a conspiracy in the WWE keeping both of them out of the main event picture, and declared they would, together, seize any future opportunity. They began referring to themselves as "The Awesome Truth". At Night of Champions on September 18, after the referee was distracted while The Miz attempted a pin, Miz assaulted him, causing Awesome Truth to lose a WWE Tag Team Championship match to Air Boom (Kofi Kingston and Evan Bourne) by disqualification. Seeking retribution, Miz and Truth later attacked both Triple H and CM Punk during their No Disqualification match in the main event. Because of their actions from the previous night, R-Truth and The Miz were fired by Triple H on the September 19 episode of Raw. At the conclusion of the main event match on October 2 at Hell in a Cell, R-Truth and The Miz jumped the barricade wearing black hooded sweatshirts and entered the cell as it was being raised. They then used weapons to attack Alberto Del Rio, Punk, John Cena, the Referee and camera men while the cell was again lowered. After this, the entire WWE roster led by Triple H came out to find a way into the cell, before New Orleans Police Department officers were able to get the door open and arrest them. The two later posted a video on YouTube apologizing to the fans for their actions. The Miz and R-Truth were reinstated by John Laurinaitis on the October 10 episode of Raw. At Vengeance on October 23, Miz and R-Truth defeated CM Punk and Triple H after interference from Triple H's long time friend Kevin Nash. Later that night they assaulted John Cena during his WWE Championship match with Alberto Del Rio. At Survivor Series on November 20, The Awesome Truth lost to Cena and The Rock. On the November 21 episode of Raw, Cena instigated an argument between R-Truth and Miz, which resulted in Miz performing a Skull Crushing Finale on the stage on R-Truth. This was a pretext to explain R-Truth's absence during his suspension as a result of his violating of the Wellness Policy.

On the November 28 episode of Raw, Miz defeated John Morrison in a Falls Count Anywhere match after a Skull Crushing Finale on the stage. On the December 5 episode of Raw, Miz qualified for a triple threat Tables, Ladders and Chairs match against Alberto Del Rio and CM Punk at the TLC: Tables, Ladders & Chairs pay-per-view for the WWE Championship on December 18 after a win over Randy Orton via countout, but lost. Miz would be the first entrant in the 2012 Royal Rumble match on January 29, eliminating Alex Riley and R-Truth and lasting over 45 minutes before he was eliminated by Big Show. At Elimination Chamber on February 19, Miz competed for the WWE Championship in the titular match, and would last until the end of the match before being eliminated by CM Punk.

Desperate for a spot on the card for the upcoming WrestleMania XXVIII event on April 1, he later joined John Laurinaitis' team for the 12-man tag team match after saving Laurinaitis from Santino Marella. Miz picked up the win for Team Johnny after pinning Zack Ryder with the help of Eve, ending his twenty-match losing streak dating back to 2011. He followed this up by losing a battle royal and a match against Brodus Clay on May 20 at Over the Limit.

Intercontinental Champion (2012–2013) 
After a two-month absence, The Miz returned at Money in the Bank on July 15 as a last-minute participant in the WWE Championship Money in the Bank contract match, won by John Cena. At Raw 1000, Miz defeated Christian to win his first Intercontinental Championship, becoming the 25th Triple Crown Champion and a Grand Slam Champion in the process. Miz successfully defended his championship against Rey Mysterio at SummerSlam on August 19, and in a fatal four-way match against Cody Rhodes, Mysterio, and Sin Cara at Night of Champions on September 16, before losing the championship to Kofi Kingston on the October 17 episode of Main Event ending his reign at 85 days. Miz failed to regain the title from Kingston in two rematches—at Hell in a Cell on October 28 and on the November 6 episode of SmackDown.

On the November 12 episode of Raw, Miz turned face for the first time since 2006 when he quit CM Punk's team and joined Mick Foley's team at Survivor Series after confronting Paul Heyman. At Survivor Series on November 18, he eliminated Wade Barrett before he was eliminated by Alberto Del Rio; his team went on to lose the match. The Miz then began a feud with United States Champion Antonio Cesaro. During this feud, Ric Flair became his mentor and Miz adopted the figure-four leglock from Flair as a new finisher. The Miz challenged for Cesaro's United States Championship at the Royal Rumble pre-show on January 27, on February 17 at Elimination Chamber and on the March 1, 2013 episode of SmackDown, but was unsuccessful each time.

Miz next sought Wade Barrett's Intercontinental Championship. He lost a triple threat match against Barrett and Chris Jericho on the March 18 episode of Raw, but defeated Barrett in a non-title match the following week to earn another shot at the title. He captured the title by defeating Barrett at the WrestleMania 29 pre-show on April 7, only to lose the title back to him the following night on Raw. Miz failed to recapture the title on June 16 at Payback and Money in the Bank on July 14.

Hollywood A-Lister (2013–2016) 
On August 18, he was the host of SummerSlam, during which he had a run-in with Fandango, beginning a feud between the two. Miz defeated Fandango on the September 2 episode of Raw and on September 15 at Night of Champions. The following night on Raw, Miz was assaulted by Randy Orton in front of his parents, resulting in a storyline injury. When Miz returned in October, he quickly lost to Orton. Miz started a feud with Kofi Kingston, defeating him on the Survivor Series pre-show on November 24, but losing a no-disqualification match at TLC: Tables, Ladders & Chairs on December 15 to end their feud. At WrestleMania XXX on April 6, 2014, he participated in the André the Giant Memorial Battle Royal, but was eliminated by Santino Marella.

After a two-month hiatus filming The Marine 4: Moving Target, The Miz returned on the June 30 episode of Raw and immediately began to insult the crowd and taking on the gimmick of a movie star, turning heel for the first time since 2012. At Battleground on July 20, Miz won a battle royal by lastly eliminating Dolph Ziggler to win the Intercontinental Championship for the third time. At SummerSlam on August 17, Ziggler defeated Miz to recapture the title. Later that month, Damien Sandow began appearing with Miz as his "stunt double" (mimicking all of Miz's moves and mannerisms) and was subsequently billed as Damien Mizdow. At Night of Champions on September 21, Miz defeated Ziggler to regain the Intercontinental Championship, only to lose the title to Ziggler in a rematch the following night. After defeating Sheamus several times with the help of Mizdow, Miz challenged him for the United States Championship at Hell in a Cell on October 26, but he was unsuccessful.

At Survivor Series on November 23, Miz and Mizdow won the WWE Tag Team Championship by winning a fatal four-way match against defending champions Gold and Stardust, The Usos and Los Matadores. At TLC: Tables, Ladders & Chairs on December 14, Miz and Mizdow lost by disqualification against The Usos after Miz hit Jimmy Uso with a Slammy Award. On the December 29 episode of Raw, Miz and Mizdow lost the titles to The Usos. Miz and Mizdow were unsuccessful in regaining the at the Royal Rumble on January 25, 2015. Miz was the first entrant in the Royal Rumble match later that night but was eliminated by Bubba Ray Dudley. After Mizdow began to get more attention from the audience, Miz relegated Mizdow to his personal assistant out of spite. Miz and Mizdow then competed in the André the Giant Memorial Battle Royal at WrestleMania 31 on March 29, which Miz failed to win after being eliminated by Mizdow, dissolving their partnership. On the April 20 episode of Raw, Miz defeated Mizdow in a match where the winner retained the Miz brand, with help from Summer Rae.

At SummerSlam on August 23, Miz competed for the Intercontinental Championship in a triple threat match also involving Big Show and Ryback, but lost. At Survivor Series on November 22, Miz competed in a traditional five-on-five elimination tag-team match alongside The Cosmic Wasteland (Stardust and The Ascension) and Bo Dallas in a losing effort against The Dudley Boyz, Goldust, Neville and Titus O'Neil. At Royal Rumble on January 24, 2016, Miz competed in the 2016 Royal Rumble match, entering at number 25 and lasting nearly 9 minutes before being eliminated by Roman Reigns. On April 3, at WrestleMania 32, Miz wrestled in a seven-man ladder match for the Intercontinental Championship, which was won by Zack Ryder.

Multiple championship reigns (2016–2018) 

On the Raw episode post-WrestleMania 32, Miz won the Intercontinental Championship for the fifth time, after his wife Maryse made her return to WWE and distracted Zack Ryder by slapping his father, thus becoming his manager in the process, where the two then became an on-screen power couple. In the weeks following, Miz and Maryse then began to cut various promos during the Miz TV segments, while calling themselves the "it" couple. At Payback on May 1, Miz defeated Cesaro to retain his championship after Cesaro was distracted by Kevin Owens and Sami Zayn brawling on the apron, leading to a feud over the Intercontinental Championship between the four men. At Extreme Rules on May 22, Miz successfully retained the championship against Cesaro, Zayn and Owens in a highly acclaimed fatal four-way match, when Miz pinned Cesaro. The following night on Raw, Miz failed to qualify for the 2016 Money in the Bank ladder match when he was defeated by Cesaro, setting up another championship match between the two set for the week's SmackDown, which Miz won. Following this, he and Maryse began filming The Marine 5: Battleground, taking them out of action. Both returned on the June 27 episode of Raw, where he lost to Kane in a championship match via countout. At Battleground on July 24, the Intercontinental Championship match between Miz and Darren Young ended in a double disqualification after The Miz pushed Bob Backlund (Darren Young's mentor) and Young attacked him. On July 19 at the 2016 WWE draft, Miz, along with Maryse was drafted to the SmackDown brand, with the Intercontinental Championship becoming exclusive to that brand. At SummerSlam on August 21, Miz successfully defended the championship against Apollo Crews.

On the August 23 episode of Talking Smack, The Miz went on a highly praised tirade against SmackDown General Manager Daniel Bryan for calling him a coward, with Miz calling Bryan a "coward" for not returning to the ring when he promised the fans he would, before telling him to "go back to the bingo halls with your indie friends". At Backlash on September 11, Miz successfully defended the title against Dolph Ziggler after Maryse sprayed an unknown substance at Ziggler while the referee was distracted. Afterwards, The Miz continued to blame Bryan and vowed not to defend his Intercontinental Championship on any show until he was granted a contract "renegotiation". At No Mercy on October 9, Miz lost the Intercontinental Championship to Ziggler in a title vs career match after Maryse and The Spirit Squad (Kenny and Mikey), were ejected from ringside, ending Miz's reign at 188 days. 
On the 900th episode of SmackDown on November 15, Maryse helped Miz to win the championship for the sixth time. Miz successfully defended the title against Raw's Sami Zayn at Survivor Series on November 20, after Maryse prematurely rang the bell, causing a distraction. Miz faced Ziggler once more in a ladder match at TLC: Tables, Ladders & Chairs on December 4, which Miz won to end their feud.

On December 6 episode of SmackDown, Miz successfully defended the title against Dean Ambrose after interference from Maryse and distraction from James Ellsworth. Two weeks later on SmackDown, Miz successfully defended the championship against Apollo Crews. After the match, Miz was interviewed by Renee Young, where Miz sarcastically responded by revealing Young and Ambrose's real life relationship, prompting her to slap Miz. On the January 3, 2017 episode of SmackDown, Miz lost the Intercontinental Championship to Ambrose despite interference from Maryse. On January 29, Miz entered the 2017 Royal Rumble match at number 15 and lasted 32 minutes until he was eliminated by The Undertaker.

On January 31 episode of SmackDown, Miz was revealed as one of the participants of the Elimination Chamber match for the WWE Championship which took place on February 12, where Miz lost after John Cena eliminated him. On the February 21 episode of SmackDown, Miz participated in a ten-man battle royal to determine the challenger for the Bray Wyatt's WWE Championship, but was eliminated by Cena. On the February 28 episode of SmackDown, Miz and Maryse made a special edition of Miz TV to critique Cena's powers on the backstage environment before Maryse slapped Cena and Nikki Bella—Cena's girlfriend—came to save him. On the March 14 episode of SmackDown, after a showdown between Miz and Maryse against Cena and Nikki, SmackDown General Manager Daniel Bryan scheduled a mixed tag team match at WrestleMania 33 on April 2, which Miz and Maryse lost.

On April 10, Miz was drafted to the Raw brand along with Maryse as part of the Superstar Shake Up, where they made their debut on the same night dressed as Cena and Nikki, before being confronted by the Intercontinental Champion Dean Ambrose, who was also drafted to Raw in the Superstar Shake-up. At Extreme Rules on June 4, Miz defeated Ambrose to win the Intercontinental Championship for the seventh time.

On the June 19 episode of Raw, Miz allied himself with Bo Dallas and Curtis Axel, a team which would later be dubbed "The Miztourage". Miz successfully defended the Intercontinental Championship against Dean Ambrose at Great Balls of Fire on July 9, due to interference from the Miztourage. At the SummerSlam pre-show on August 20, Miz and The Miztourage defeated Jason Jordan and The Hardy Boyz (Jeff Hardy and Matt Hardy) in a six-man tag-team match. In September, Miz began a feud with Jordan after he was declared number one contender to Miz's championship. At No Mercy on September 25, Miz successfully retained the championship against Jordan.

The following month, he allied himself with Cesaro and Sheamus in order to take on the reformed Shield faction (Ambrose, Seth Rollins and Roman Reigns). Miz teamed with Cesaro, Sheamus, Kane and Braun Strowman against Ambrose, Rollins and Kurt Angle (who replaced Reigns after he was not medically cleared to compete) in a 5-on-3 handicap Tables, Ladders and Chairs match at TLC: Tables, Ladders & Chairs on October 22 in a losing effort. On November 19, Miz faced SmackDown's United States Champion Baron Corbin at Survivor Series in an interbrand champion vs. champion match, which he lost. The following night on Raw, Miz lost to Roman Reigns in an Intercontinental Championship match, ending his title reign at 169 days.

After taking a hiatus, Miz returned in January 2018, and won the Intercontinental Championship back from Reigns during the 25th Anniversary of Raw, beginning his eighth reign with the championship. Miz then participated in the 2018 Royal Rumble match on January 28, but he failed to win the match after being eliminated by the combined effort of Rollins and Reigns. At the Elimination Chamber event on February 25, Miz competed in an Elimination Chamber match to determine the number one contender for the Universal Championship, but he was the first participant eliminated, by Braun Strowman. Also around this time, Miz took part in the Mixed Match Challenge tournament, with Asuka as his partner. They defeated the teams of Big E and Carmella, Finn Bálor and Sasha Banks and Braun Strowman and Alexa Bliss, before defeating Bobby Roode and Charlotte Flair in the finals to win the tournament and earn $100,000 for the charity of their choice. At WrestleMania 34 on April 8, Miz lost the Intercontinental title to Seth Rollins in a triple threat match also involving Finn Bálor, suffering his first pinfall loss at WrestleMania.

Various storylines (2018–2020) 
On April 16, during the Superstar Shake-up, Miz was traded to the SmackDown brand. Later that night in his final match for Raw, Miz teamed with The Miztourage, Kevin Owens and Sami Zayn against Seth Rollins, Finn Bálor, Braun Strowman, Bobby Roode and Bobby Lashley in a ten-man tag team match; his team lost after The Miztourage walked out on him, officially ending their partnership. Miz would fail to regain the Intercontinental Championship from Rollins in a ladder match also involving Bálor and Samoa Joe at the Greatest Royal Rumble event on April 27, and subsequently in a singles match on May 6 at Backlash. On the May 8 episode of SmackDown Live, Miz defeated United States Champion Jeff Hardy to qualify for the men's Money in the Bank ladder match at the namesake event. At the event on June 17, Miz failed to win the ladder match.

Throughout July and August, Miz would taunt and goad long-time rival Daniel Bryan. Despite initially backing down from his Bryan's challenge for a match at SummerSlam on August 20, he reconsidered and accepted it. Miz defeated Bryan after pinning him following the undetected use of a pair of brass knuckles. Following SummerSlam, it was announced that Miz and Maryse would be facing Bryan and his wife Brie Bella at Hell in a Cell. At the event on September on September 16, Miz and Maryse won after Maryse pinned Bella. In October, Miz and Bryan were announced to be facing each other once more at the Super Show-Down event with the winner getting a future WWE Championship match against AJ Styles. At the event on October 6, Miz lost to Bryan.

On the 1000th episode of SmackDown on October 16, Miz defeated Rusev to qualify for the WWE World Cup tournament to determine the "Best Wrestler in the World" at Crown Jewel event. At the event on November 2, Miz defeated Jeff Hardy and Rey Mysterio to advance to the finals against Dolph Ziggler, but injured his knee before the match, rendering him unable to compete. SmackDown Commissioner Shane McMahon replaced him and defeated Ziggler, winning the World Cup. On the following episode of SmackDown, Bryan and Miz were announced as co-captain of the Men's Survivor Series match at the Survivor Series pay-per-view, however, SmackDown General Manager Paige removed Bryan from the match the following week and replaced him with Jeff Hardy, leaving Miz as the sole captain of Team SmackDown for the event. At the event on November 18, Team SmackDown lost to Team Raw.

Miz would begin to pursue a partnership with McMahon, with the promise of becoming the "best tag team in the world". McMahon would finally agree to the team proposal in December, turning Miz into a fan favorite for the first time since June 2014. The duo would then challenge SmackDown Tag Team Champions Cesaro and Sheamus to a title match at the 2019 Royal Rumble pay-per-view on January 27, 2019, in which Miz and McMahon would defeat the duo to become the new champions. However, at Elimination Chamber on February 17, Miz and McMahon lost the titles to The Usos, ending their reign at 21 days. The duo failed to regain the titles from the Usos at Fastlane on March 10. After the loss, McMahon turned on Miz by attacking both him and his father at ringside, turning McMahon heel. This led to a falls count anywhere match at WrestleMania 35 on April 7, which Miz lost. On April 15, Miz was drafted to Raw as part of the 2019 WWE Superstar Shake-up. Upon his acquisition, he would attack McMahon with a steel chair. Subsequently, Miz would challenge McMahon to a steel cage match at Money in the Bank. At the event on May 19, Miz was again narrowly defeated. On June 7 at Super ShowDown, Miz competed in the 51-man battle royal, but did not win.

In July, Miz restarted his feud with Dolph Ziggler after a confrontation on Miz TV. A match between the two was arranged for SummerSlam, however during the contract signing on the August 5 episode of Raw, Miz revealed that he was not Ziggler's opponent, instead it was the returning Goldberg who would take Miz's place in the match. He stated in an interview: “I’ll have many other opportunities at SummerSlam, but this might be Goldberg's last.” On the Raw after SummerSlam, Miz defeated Ziggler to end their feud. Miz then competed in the 2019 King of the Ring, but was eliminated in the first round by Baron Corbin. Miz then unsuccessfully challenged for Shinsuke Nakamura's Intercontinental Championship at Clash of Champions on September 15, after interference from Nakamura's manager Sami Zayn.

As part of the 2019 draft, Miz was drafted to the SmackDown brand. During the November 1 episode of SmackDown, NXT wrestler Tommaso Ciampa disrupted an edition of Miz TV to air his grievances towards Miz, accusing him of being self-centered. He subsequently challenged Ciampa to a match, which he would lose via pinfall. The following month, Miz began a feud with Universal Champion Bray Wyatt, who, under his sinister alter ego "The Fiend", proclaimed he wanted to become part of Miz's family. He would later attack Miz backstage. Subsequently, a non-title match between Miz and Wyatt was arranged for the TLC pay-per-view on December 15, which Miz lost.

Reunion with John Morrison (2020–2021) 
On the January 3, 2020 episode of SmackDown, Miz blindsided Kofi Kingston after being defeated in a match against him and subsequently lashed out at the audience after being booed, turning heel for the first time since 2018. Later that night, he reunited with his former tag team partner John Morrison, who made his return to WWE. Miz participated in the 2020 Royal Rumble match but was eliminated by the eventual winner Drew McIntyre in 30 seconds. After winning a title shot on the January 31, episode of SmackDown, Miz and Morrison won the SmackDown Tag Team Championship from The New Day at Super ShowDown. At Elimination Chamber on March 8, Miz and Morrison retained the championship over The New Day, The Usos, Heavy Machinery (Otis and Tucker), Lucha House Party (Gran Metalik and Lince Dorado) and Dolph Ziggler and Robert Roode in a tag team Elimination Chamber match. Miz and Morrison were originally set to defend the championship in a triple threat tag team ladder match against The New Day and The Usos at WrestleMania 36, but Miz pulled out of the event due to concerns arising from the COVID-19 pandemic. Instead, Morrison individually defended the championship in a triple threat ladder match against Kofi Kingston of The New Day and Jimmy Uso of The Usos, which Morrison won. On the April 17 episode of SmackDown, the duo lost the titles back to The New Day after Miz unsuccessfully defended the titles by himself in a triple threat match against Big E and Jey Uso ending their reign at 50 days. At Money in the Bank on May 10, Miz and Morrison unsuccessfully attempted to regain the championship in a fatal four-way tag team match also involving Lucha House Party (Gran Metalik and Lince Dorado) and The Forgotten Sons (Steve Cutler and Wesley Blake). Next, Miz and Morrison started a rivalry with Universal Champion Braun Strowman. At Backlash on June 14, the duo competed for Strowman's title in a two-on-one handicap match, but lost.

Miz and Morrison then began feuding with Otis and Tucker in pursuit of Otis' Money in the Bank contract. During the 2020 WWE Draft in October, Miz and Morrison were drafted to the Raw brand. At Hell in a Cell on October 25, Miz defeated Otis to win the Money in the Bank contract, becoming the second person not to do so in the Money in the Bank ladder match, and the third person to hold the contract more than once. Miz cashed in his Money in the Bank contract on December 20 at the TLC: Tables, Ladders & Chairs event during a TLC match between AJ Styles and the WWE Champion Drew McIntyre, making the match a triple threat in the process, but was unsuccessful as McIntyre retained his title. However, on the December 28 episode of Raw, Miz had the contract returned to him as the cash-in at TLC was ruled invalid due to Morrison cashing in the contract on his behalf (as only the contract holder himself can cash it in). Miz entered the Royal Rumble match on January 31, 2021, but he was quickly eliminated by the debuting Damian Priest. At Elimination Chamber on February 21, Miz would successfully cash his Money in the Bank contract on WWE Champion Drew McIntyre, after McIntyre was assaulted by Bobby Lashley, starting his second reign with the WWE Championship which made him the first ever two-time WWE Grand Slam champion. Miz would go on to lose the championship to Lashley on the March 1 episode of Raw, ending his reign at only eight days.

After this, Miz and Morrison feuded with Damian Priest and rapper Bad Bunny. On the first night of WrestleMania 37 on April 10, Miz and Morrison were defeated by Bad Bunny and Priest. At WrestleMania Backlash on May 16, Miz lost to Priest. After the match, Miz was seemingly "eaten" by zombies as a way to cross-promote Army of the Dead. During the match, Miz suffered the first legitimate injury in his WWE career after tearing his ACL, taking him out of action indefinitely. Despite his injury, Miz would continue appearing television in a wheelchair accompanying Morrison in his matches. Miz returned from injury on the August 16 episode of Raw, losing to Damian Priest. The next week on Raw, Miz attacked Morrison, ending their partnership. Afterwards, Miz took time off to compete on the thirtieth season of Dancing with the Stars.

Alliance with Tommaso Ciampa (2021–present) 
Miz, along with Maryse, returned on the November 29 episode of Raw, where he confronted Edge. The following week on Raw, after another heated verbal exchange between the two during a Miz TV segment, Miz challenged Edge to a match at Day 1, which Edge accepted. At Day 1 on January 1, 2022, Edge defeated Miz. On the following episode of Raw, Miz accepted a challenge by Edge and Beth Phoenix for a mixed tag team match at Royal Rumble on January 29 between him and Maryse, which Edge and Phoenix won. On the first night of WrestleMania 38 on April 2, Miz and social media star Logan Paul defeated The Mysterios. After the match, Miz performed his finishing maneuver, the Skull Crushing Finale, on Logan Paul, subsequently turning on him. On the July 4 episode of Raw, The Miz gained a new ally in Ciampa, joining forces to attack AJ Styles. Meanwhile, Miz and Paul began a feud which led to a match between the two at SummerSlam on July 30, which Paul won. On the August 8 episode of Raw, Miz lost to Styles in a no disqualification match. On the August 22 episode of Raw, Miz was kidnapped by Dexter Lumis, who continued to attack him and stalk him over the following weeks. It was later revealed by Johnny Gargano that The Miz had been paying Lumis to stage these attacks to gain The Miz publicity. The Miz then stopped paying Lumis, and the attacks became real. He challenged Bobby Lashley for the United States Championship in a steel cage match on the September 5 episode of Raw, but lost after Lumis interfered. On the November 28, episode to Raw, Miz lost to Lumis in an Anything Goes match where Lumis earned a WWE contract. On the December 19, episode of Raw, Miz defeated Lumis in a Winner Takes All Ladder Match of prize money after interference from the returning Bronson Reed ending their feud. At the Royal Rumble on January 28, 2023 Miz entered the Royal Rumble match at #3 but was eliminated by Sheamus. On the February 20 episode of “Raw”, during the celebration of their anniversary, Maryse handed The Miz an envelope with the Miz promising to reveal its contents on the following episode of “Raw”. This led to The Miz being named the official Host of WrestleMania 39.

Professional wrestling style and persona 

The Miz's finisher, per the reality television and Hollywood tie-ins to his character, is a full nelson facebuster dubbed the Skull Crushing Finale. He originally performed a swinging neckbreaker dubbed Mizard of Oz that he developed into a running knee lift followed by a neckbreaker slam, named the Reality Check, before abandoning both and adopting his current finisher in mid-2009.

Having been associated with Ric Flair, The Miz occasionally performs Flair's submission hold, the figure-four leg lock. Since his storyline with Daniel Bryan, The Miz incorporated several of Bryan's moves, like the Yes! Kicks, which he nicknames the It Kicks.

Criticism has been focused on the booking of The Miz's character. When he became a heroic character in late-2012, his turn was not well received by critics, who commented that Miz as a fan favorite was too similar to his villainous character because he was "still cocky, arrogant, and egotistical" while "pivoted toward calling out established heels" (villains). Other criticisms were that Miz was "juvenile", lacking of depth, "grating and not endearing to the audience" and that "there was not that moment when he officially turned and aligned his values with the audience's". After The Miz won the WWE Championship for the second time in February 2021, Zack Heydorn for Pro Wrestling Torch questioned the decision to give him the championship, writing that he had not been presented as "a credible professional wrestler in the ring", and complained his recent booking had not made him believable contender for a world championship. He then concluded by saying that he "should be far away from the WWE Championship picture." Ryan Byers of 411Mania considered Miz to be a poor world champion, stating that he was "booked ridiculously weakly". Despite this disapproval towards his character, Miz has received praise for his promos and speaking ability.

Other media 

In 2008, Miz made his first WWE video game appearance in WWE SmackDown vs. Raw 2009 and appears in every WWE video game since, with his latest appearance being WWE 2K Battlegrounds.
In 2012, Miz also appeared in the WWE Studios and Kare Prod project Les reines du ring (Queens of the Ring), alongside Eve Torres and CM Punk, and on MDA Show of Strength with Maryse and other celebrities. In March 2013, he attended the Kids Choice Awards with Maryse and The Rock.

Mizanin played a small role in the film The Campaign in 2012. In 2013, The Miz starred in WWE Studios film The Marine 3: Homefront, replacing fellow wrestler Randy Orton, who was dropped from the role due to his bad conduct discharge from the Marine Corps.

Mizanin starred in the ABC Family television film Christmas Bounty, which premiered in December 2013. In 2015, he starred in the WWE Studios Christmas film Santa's Little Helper.

In 2016, Mizanin guest-starred in Supernatural as a wrestler named Shawn Harley in an organization targeted by a demon.

In 2018, Mizanin and his wife Maryse starred in a USA Network reality television series titled Miz & Mrs.  In 2020, he starred on a second show on USA, serving as host of the game show Cannonball.

Personal life 

Mizanin married his longtime girlfriend, French-Canadian fellow WWE wrestler Maryse Ouellet, in The Bahamas on February 20, 2014. Their first daughter, Monroe Sky Mizanin, was born on March 27, 2018. Shortly thereafter, the family moved to Austin, Texas. During WWE's Elimination Chamber event in February 2019, the couple announced that they were expecting their second child in September. In August 2019, they moved permanently to Thousand Oaks, California. Their second daughter, Madison Jade Mizanin, was born on September 20, 2019.

Filmography

Film

Television

Championships and accomplishments 

 The Baltimore Sun
 Most Improved Wrestler of the Year (2009)
Tag Team of the Year (2008) – with John Morrison
 Deep South Wrestling
 DSW Heavyweight Championship (1 time)
 Ohio Valley Wrestling
 OVW Southern Tag Team Championship (1 time) – with Chris Cage
 Pro Wrestling Illustrated
 Most Hated Wrestler of the Year (2011)
 Most Improved Wrestler of the Year (2016)
 Ranked No. 1 of the top 500 singles wrestlers in the PWI 500 in 2011
 Rolling Stone
 Ranked No. 8 of the 10 best WWE wrestlers of 2016
 WWE Wrestler of the Year (2017)
 World Wrestling Entertainment/WWE
WWE Championship (2 times)
WWE Intercontinental Championship (8 times)
WWE United States Championship (2 times)
WWE Tag Team Championship (4 times) – with John Morrison (1), Big Show (1), John Cena (1) and Damien Mizdow (1)
WWE SmackDown Tag Team Championship (2 times) – with Shane McMahon (1) and John Morrison (1)
World Tag Team Championship (2 times) – with John Morrison (1) and Big Show (1)
Mixed Match Challenge (Season 1) – with Asuka
Money in the Bank (Raw 2010)
25th Triple Crown Champion
Fifth Grand Slam Champion (under the current format, 14th overall)
First two-time Grand Slam Champion
Slammy Award (2 times)
 Best WWE.com Exclusive (2008)  – with John Morrison
 Tag Team of the Year (2008) – with John Morrison
 Wrestling Observer Newsletter
 Most Improved (2008, 2009)
 Tag Team of the Year (2008) – with John Morrison
 Worst Match of the Year (2021)

References

External links 

 
 
 

1980 births
21st-century American male actors
21st-century professional wrestlers
American people of German descent
American people of English descent
American people of Romanian descent
American people of Slovak descent
American people of Greek descent
American male professional wrestlers
American television hosts
Living people
Masked wrestlers
NWA/WCW/WWE United States Heavyweight Champions
People from Parma, Ohio
Professional wrestlers from California
Professional wrestlers from Ohio
Sportspeople from Cuyahoga County, Ohio
Sportspeople from Los Angeles
The Challenge (TV series) contestants
The Real World (TV series) cast members
Tough Enough contestants
WWF/WWE Intercontinental Champions
WWE Champions
Miami University alumni
WWE Grand Slam champions